No Chang-joong (Hangul: 노창중, born September 24, 1991), better known by his stage name Genius Nochang (Hangul: 그냥노창), is a South Korean rapper. He released his first album, Remember When, on July 27, 2010.

Discography

Studio albums

Singles

References

1991 births
Living people
South Korean male rappers
South Korean hip hop singers
21st-century South Korean male  singers